The 2013 Cedar Rapids Titans season was the second season of the Cedar Rapids Titans as a football franchise in the Indoor Football League (IFL). One of just nine teams competing in the IFL for the 2013 season, the Cedar Rapids Titans were members of the league's United Conference. The team played their home games at the Cedar Rapids Ice Arena in Cedar Rapids, Iowa. The Titans had been scheduled to play this season in the renovated U.S. Cellular Center but construction delays kept that building from re-opening during the 2013 IFL season.

Off-field moves
All Titans games, home and away, were broadcast live on WMT-FM (95.7 FM) this season. Play-by-play duties were split by local radio hosts Dan Egger and Jon Swisher plus Jarod Aarons doing color commentary during home games. In addition, home games were televised on a tape-delay via Mediacom's MC22 with Rob Brooks and Jerry Kiwala calling the action. Local media coverage included a weekly wrap-up show titled Titans Extra hosted by Rob Brooks, head coach Mark Stoute, and general manager Chris Kokalis.

Shortly before the 2013 season began, the owner of the Cheyenne Warriors died and the IFL revised its schedule to accommodate the now 9-team league.

On March 4, 2013, minority owner Mike Polaski placed an advertisement on Craigslist offering his 20 percent stake in the Titans for sale. The restaurateur cited a "downturn in [his] core business" for seeking $80,000 for his fifth of the team's shares. The ad was taken down after local media reports about the sale.

Roster moves
The coaching staff for 2013 included head coach Mark Stoute and assistant coaches Sean Ponder, Michael Custer, and Ed Flanagan.

Schedule
Key:

Preseason

Regular season

Post-season

Roster

Standings

References

External links
Cedar Rapids Titans official website
Cedar Rapids Titans official statistics
Cedar Rapids Titans at The Gazette
2013 IFL regular season schedule

Cedar Rapids
Cedar Rapids River Kings
Cedar Rapids Titans